Miklós Rajna (born 22 June 1991 in Dunaújváros) is a Hungarian professional ice hockey goaltender who plays for Coventry Blaze in the UK's Elite Ice Hockey League (EIHL).

Playing career
Producing a 94.8 percent saving percentage, Rajna played a key role in Alba Volán's triumph in the 2012–13 Erste Bank Young Stars League (the Austrian youth league), subsequently he was promoted to the senior team in the summer of 2013.

In the same year he was selected for the Hungarian national team that played at the 2013 IIHF World Championship Division I.

References

External links

1991 births
Fehérvár AV19 players
Dunaújvárosi Acélbikák players
MAC Budapest players
Coventry Blaze players
Living people
Hungarian ice hockey goaltenders
Sportspeople from Dunaújváros